Pablo Alejandro Pajurek (born 26 June 1992) is an Argentine professional footballer who plays as a centre-back.

Career
Pajurek, from Boca Juniors, started his career with Sarmiento. He played in his first professional match on 25 November 2013 versus Banfield, which was followed by a further five appearances in the 2013–14 season; which included a Copa Argentina encounter with Talleres. Pajurek completed a move to Torneo Federal A's 9 de Julio in 2015. He appeared again against Talleres for his 9 de Julio debut on 23 March, for what was his only game for them. 2016 saw Pajurek join Ferro Carril Oeste, where he'd feature seven times; notably receiving two red cards. He also scored his first goal; versus Unión Aconquija in the play-offs.

Further stints in Torneo Federal A with Sportivo Las Parejas and Deportivo Mandiyú followed across 2016–17 and 2017–18, with the latter ending with them being relegated to the fourth tier. In January 2019, Pajurek agreed terms with Deportivo Español of Primera B Metropolitana. No matches came in the succeeding months, with Pajurek subsequently leaving to Almafuerte Córdoba of Liga Riotercerense in March. In February 2020, Pajurek moved abroad to Spain as he joined Primera Catalana side La Jonquera. He made appearances against Rubí and Lloret, prior to departing in June to Segunda División B with Llagostera. Shortly after, in August 2020, he moved to Atletic Lleida, where he made two appearances in October, prior to joining Inter Ibiza Club Deportivo, where he played 16 games and scored two goal from November 2021 to the end of the 2020-21 season. In the 2021-22 season, he turned out for UE Sant Josep.

Career statistics
.

References

External links

1992 births
Living people
Footballers from Córdoba, Argentina
Argentine footballers
Association football defenders
Argentine expatriate footballers
Expatriate footballers in Spain
Argentine expatriate sportspeople in Spain
Primera Nacional players
Torneo Federal A players
Divisiones Regionales de Fútbol players
Club Atlético Sarmiento footballers
9 de Julio de Morteros players
Sportivo Las Parejas footballers
Deportivo Mandiyú footballers
Deportivo Español footballers
UE Costa Brava players